The 1931–32 Scottish Division One season was won by Motherwell by five points over nearest rival Rangers. Dundee United and Leith Athletic finished 19th and 20th respectively and were relegated to the 1932–33 Scottish Division Two.

League table

Results

References 

 Statto.com

1931–32 Scottish Football League
Scottish Division One seasons
Scot